Steve Gordon (born 17 September 1986) is an Australian former professional rugby league footballer who last played for the Western Suburbs Rosellas of the Newcastle Rugby League. He previously played in the National Rugby League for the Newcastle Knights.

Background
Gordon was born in Dubbo, New South Wales.  Gordon played his junior football for Dubbo and the Western Suburbs Rosellas before being signed by the Newcastle Knights.

Playing career
In Round 8 of the 2007 NRL season, he made his NRL debut for the Knights against the Canterbury-Bankstown Bulldogs.

References

1986 births
Living people
Australian rugby league players
Newcastle Knights players
Newcastle Yowies players
Rugby league fullbacks
Rugby league players from Dubbo
Western Suburbs Rosellas players